Kelmend is a former municipality in the Shkodër County, northwestern Albania. At the 2015 local government reform it became a subdivision of the municipality Malësi e Madhe. The population at the 2011 census was 3,056.

Settlements 
The municipal unit is part of the larger Kelmend region, and consists of eight major settlements, along with several other minor settlements.

Vermosh
Brojë
Budaç
Gropat e Selcës
Javor
Kozhnjë
Kozhnjë e Sipërme
Lëpushë
Mreg 
Nikç
Selcë
Tamarë
Vukël

References

External links

 Discovery Kelmend & Shkrel 
 Kelmend Municipality

 
Administrative units of Malësi e Madhe
Former municipalities in Shkodër County